Nosean, also known as noselite, is a mineral of the feldspathoid group with formula: Na8Al6Si6O24(SO4). H2O. It forms isometric crystals of variable color: white, grey, blue, green, to brown. It has a Mohs hardness of 5.5 to 6 and a specific gravity of 2.3 to 2.4. It is fluorescent. It is found in low-silica igneous rocks. There is a solid solution between nosean and hauyne, which contains calcium.

It was first described in 1815 from the Rhineland in Germany and named after the German mineralogist K. W. Nose (1753–1835). The mineral is rare but widespread, found in such diverse localities as ocean islands (e.g., Tahiti) and the La Sal Range in Utah.

References

 Webmineral data
 Mindat with location data

Feldspathoid
Sodalite group
Sodium minerals
Aluminium minerals
Sulfate minerals
Cubic minerals
Minerals in space group 215